Mayana may refer to:
Mayana, Iran, a village in Kermanshah Province, Iran
Mayana Moura (b. 1982), Brazilian actress
Mayana Zatz (b. 1947), Brazilian molecular biologist and geneticist
Mayana (bug), a genus of true bug in family Oxycarenidae